A brain tumor is an abnormal growth of cells within the brain or inside the skull, and can be cancerous (malignant) or non-cancerous (benign). Just over half of all primary brain tumors are malignant; the rest are benign, though they may still be life-threatening. In the United States in 2000, survivors of benign primary brain tumors outnumbered those who had cancerous primary brain tumors by approximately 4:1. Metastatic brain cancer is over six times more common than primary brain cancer, as it occurs in about 10–30% of all people with cancer.

This is a list of notable people who have had a primary or metastatic brain tumor (either benign or malignant) at some time in their lives, as confirmed by public information. Tumor type and survival duration are listed where the information is known. Blank spaces in these columns appear where precise information has not been released to the public. Medicine does not designate most long-term survivors as cured.

The National Cancer Institute estimated 22,070 new cases of primary brain cancer and 12,920 deaths due to the illness in the United States in 2009. The age-adjusted incidence rate is 6.4 per 100,000 per year, and the death rate is 4.3 per 100,000 per year. The lifetime risk of developing brain cancer for someone born today is 0.60%. Only around a third of those diagnosed with brain cancer survive for five years after diagnosis. These high overall mortality rates are a result of the prevalence of aggressive types, such as glioblastoma multiforme. Nearly 14% of new brain tumor diagnoses occur in persons under 20 years of age.

Acting

Business

Film, television, and radio

Military

Miscellaneous

Music

Politics and government

Science

Sports

Visual arts

Writing

Notes and references

Brain tumor patients